Bollon is a rural town and locality in the Shire of Balonne, Queensland, Australia.

Geography 
Bollon is situated on the Balonne Highway, between St George and Cunnamulla on the banks of Wallam Creek. A stand of River red gums along the creek is home to a large colony of koalas.

History 
Gunya (Kunya, Kunja, Kurnja) is an Australian Aboriginal language spoken by the Gunya people. The Gunya language region includes the landscape within the local government boundaries of the Paroo Shire Council, taking in Cunnamulla and extending north towards Augathella, east towards Bollon and west towards Thargomindah.

The town is thought to be named after the Mandandanji language word balun or balonn meaning water or a running stream.

On 26 June 1879 the Queensland Government auctioned 40 town lots and 12 suburban lots in Bollon. By June 1880, the town had a hotel (the Great Western), a store and a postal receiving office.

Bollon Provisional School opened on 27 July 1885. On 1 January 1902 it became Bollon State School.

On Sunday 16 February 1936, St Mary's Anglican Church was officially opened and dedicated by Bishop Horace Dixon.

In 2010, Narkoola National Park was established in the west of the town's boundaries to preserve plant communities of the Mulga Lands bioregion.

At the 2011 census, Bollon had a population of 334.

Education 
Bollon State School is a government primary (Prep-6) school for boys and girls at Main Street. In 2017, the school had an enrolment of 23 students with 5 teachers (3 full-time equivalent) and 5 non-teaching staff (2 full-time equivalent).

Amenities 

Bollon has the Bollon Civic Centre, showground and a park.

Balonne Shire Council operates a library in Main Street, next to the Civic Centre.

The Bollon branch of the Queensland Country Women's Association has its rooms at 17 Main Street.

St Mary The Virgin Anglican Church is at 25-27 Belmore Street  (corner of George Street).

Attractions 
Bollon Heritage Centre is a local history museum at 23 Main Street.

References

Further reading

External links 
 
 

Towns in Queensland
Shire of Balonne
1879 establishments in Australia
Populated places established in 1879
Localities in Queensland